Boonea impressa, common name the impressed odostome,  is a species of sea snail, a marine gastropod mollusk in the family Pyramidellidae, the pyrams and their allies. The species is one of twelve known species within the Boonea genus of gastropods.

The preferred host of this ectoparasite is the eastern oyster Crassostrea virginica.

Description
The thick shell is opaque and grows to a length of 6.7 mm. The teleoconch contains seven flat whorls with a deep suture. The body whorl has 15 revolving lines, the upper ones more distant, about four lines on the next whorl, the number of lines diminishing on the upper whorls. The columellar tooth is distinct.

Distribution
This species occurs in the following locations:
 Caribbean Sea
 Gulf of Mexico: Louisiana, Texas, Yucatan, Mexico
 Northwest Atlantic Ocean: Maryland, North Carolina, South Carolina, Virginia, Georgia, Florida
 the Atlantic Ocean off Brazil.

References

 Jacot, A. P. (1921). Some marine shells of Beaufort and vicinity. Journal of the Elisha Mitchell Scientific Society 36: 129-145, pls. 11-13
 Bartsch, P. 1955. The pyramidellid mollusks of the Pliocene deposits of North St. Petersburg, Florida. Smithsonian Miscellaneous Collections 125(2): iii + 102 pp., 18 pls.

External links
 To Biodiversity Heritage Library (6 publications)
 To Encyclopedia of Life
 To USNM Invertebrate Zoology Mollusca Collection
 To ITIS
 To World Register of Marine Species
 

Pyramidellidae
Gastropods described in 1822